Padakasti is a small revenue village in Mulbagal taluk, Kolar district, Karnataka.

References

Villages in Kolar district